In Greek mythology, Lybie or Libye (Ancient Greek: Λυβιη, Lubiē; often written Lybië) was the mother of Belus by Poseidon and a personification and queen of the country of Libya.  Some sources describe her as the mother of Lamia.

Notes

References 
Queens in Greek mythology

 Aristophanes, Peace from The Complete Greek Drama, vol. 2. Eugene O'Neill, Jr. New York. Random House. 1938. Online version at the Perseus Digital Library.
 Aristophanes, Aristophanes Comoediae edited by F.W. Hall and W.M. Geldart, vol. 1. F.W. Hall and W.M. Geldart. Oxford. Clarendon Press, Oxford. 1907.  Greek text available at the Perseus Digital Library.

Princesses in Greek mythology
Libyan characters in Greek mythology